HD 95086 is a pre-main-sequence star. Its surface temperature is 7750 K. HD 95086 is somewhat metal-deficient in comparison to the Sun, with a metallicity Fe/H index of −0.25 (~55%), and is much younger at an age of 13.3 million years. It was originally thought to be part of the Lower Centaurus-Crux association, until it was found using Gaia data that the star may be instead part of the Carina association.

Multiplicity surveys did not detect any stellar companions to HD 95086 as of 2013.

Planetary system
In 2013, one planet, named HD 95086 b, was discovered on a wide orbit by direct imaging. The discovery was confirmed in 2014.

Besides the planet, the star is surrounded by a complex, relatively massive (0.5 ) debris disk, which may consist of up to four belts (Hot, Warm, Cold and Halo) separated by gaps. A small amount (1.4–13)×10−6  of gaseous carbon monoxide was detected in the outer disk, implying a recent collisional cascade followed by cometary activity of fresh debris.

In August 2022, this planetary system was included among 20 systems to be named by the third NameExoWorlds project.

References

Carina (constellation)

Pre-main-sequence stars
Planetary systems with one confirmed planet
J10570301-6840023
CD-68 847
053524
095086
Circumstellar disks